Masani barrage, also Masani bridge, a barrage on the seasonal Sahibi River completed in 1989, is named after the Masani village in Rewari District of Haryana in India. Masani barrage also serves as a bridge on NH 919. Water storage in the barrage was made perennial in 2017 after a gap of 50 years. This barrage is important part of ecological corridor along the route of Sahibi river which traverses from Aravalli hills in Rajasthan to Yamuna via Matanhail forest, Chhuchhakwas-Godhari, Khaparwas Wildlife Sanctuary, Bhindawas Wildlife Sanctuary, Outfall Drain Number 8 and 6, Sarbashirpur, Sultanpur National Park, Basai and The Lost Lake (Gurugram).

Location and transport 

Masani barrage is also used as the bridge on National highway NH 919 (former name NH 71B) which merges with national highway NH 48 (former name NH 8) (Delhi-Jaipur-Mumbai) at this barrage. Union govt announced the plan to four-lane the Masani barrage road (c. Aug 2017).

Background

Etymology
.

Masani barrage is named after the Masani village in Rewari District of Haryana in India. Masani village itself is named after the Masani Devi, which itself is an avatar (manifestation) of Hindu deity Shakti Devi - a universal divine creative feminine power.

History

Barrage was built in 1989. on the seasonal Sahibi river which is 120 km long and flows from Aravalli hills in Rajasthan to South Haryana and Delhi. After Sahibi river caused floods in 1977, then Prime Minister Morarji Desai mandated a flood control and water utilization master plan for the Sahibi river basin, consequently under which construction on Masani barrage commenced in February 1979 and completed in 1989.

Barrage

Technical details
It lies in the Indian seismic zone IV. It has 18 gates/bays to release water. 18 km barrage wall built at the cost of INR 50 crore has  to  resorvior to hold water.

Irrigation and flood control
Barrage was built to provide irrigation facilities to 50,000 acres in Haryana, and flood protection to 1.60 lakh acres in Haryana and 40,000 acres in Delhi.

Wildlife

Fauna 

Masani barrage wetland is spread over Dungerwas, Kharkhara and Nikhri villages. Over 20,000 migratory birds of 50 species from Siberia, Russia, Mongolia, Alaska and other parts of the United States are found at the barrage during the winter. Their number is rising since there is favourable habitat and easy availability of food. Bird species found here are wagtails, common teal, pintail, northern shoveller, garganey, eurasian coot, redshank, common sandpiper, ruff, wood sandpiper, marsh sandpiper, stint, kentish plover, greater sand plover, little ringed plover, white-tailed lapwing, greater flamingo, common pochard, ferruginous pochard, gulls and pied avocet. The pacific golden plover, rare a rare bird species from Western Alaska, has also been spotted. Over 4,000 migratory birds have been spotted at Bawal HSIDC wetland between Toyota Gosei Minda factory and Baba Pachpir Temple in the east HSIIDC Estate in Bawal, which is 15 km northeast from Masani barrage.

The tourism potential can be enhanced if the boating and food court are opened at Masani barrage.

Flora

Golden Triangle ecotourism

Since Masani falls on the Golden Triangle tourist circuit, a large number of international and domestic tourist pass through via the national highway connecting Delhi-Agra to Jaipur & Bikaner-Jaisalmer, this is continuously being improved as a major tourist stop. Lakes here have boating, nature's trail, herbal and eco park, resthouse and lodging, food court and restroom facilities. A zoo is also under development in 2018–19.

The tourism potential can be enhanced if the boating and food court are opened.

Masani barrage wetland 

The "Golden Jubli lakes and nature park" is located immediately upstream of the barrage. Two lakes, at Masani barrage flood gates and next to Nikhri village, within immediate upstream catchment of the barrage were dugout, rejuvenated and made perennial using the water from the Lal Bahadur Shastri channel of  Jawahar Lal Nehru Canal from Western Yamuna Canal. Boating facilities have been made available at these lakes. Of the planned 18 km nature's trail along its bank under development, 6 km have been readied already by August 2018. The lakes are an important feeding and breeding ground for large number of migratory birds who arrive here every year.

Rajiv Gandhi Herbal Park and Nature Camp

This is located immediately downstream of the barrage, on the right side i.e. east flank of the barrage water/flood gates. Rajiv Gandhi Herbal Park and Nature Camp, Masani, was set up on floodplain of Masani barrage in 2011 by Haryana government to promote ecotourism. It entails a herbal conservation park, ayurveda center, wetlands and children park set up by the Forests Department, Haryana. Haryana Tourism has also made log huts accommodation, tree houses, nature trails and dining facilities. Haryana Forest Development Corporation is building an adventure tourism centre, with a one km long ropeway, on 45 acres of land at Masani barrage (c. Mar 2017).

Ecological concerns

1970s-80s plans to recharge the subsoil water (plunged to 100 ft depth) vanished with the continual reduction in rainfall and construction of several dams over the Sahibi river in Rajasthan, resulting in basin of the Masani Barrage remaining dry since the late 1980s.

Entire 100 km stretch of Sahibi river and its streams (Sota River, Kotkasim drain and Indori river) in Haryana are ecologically dead. Gurugram also dumps polluted discharge in the riverbed of Sahibi.

Restoration
Government of Haryana is coordinating with Government of Rajasthan to ensure water reaches usually-dry masani barrage and dying seasonal Sahibi river. Another government project is being implemented to direct the extra water of Yamuna river during monsoon to Masani barrage through Jawahar Lal Nehru Canal and Western Yamuna Canal (c. July 2015). In 2016, govt decided to disallow farming on 700 acre land around Masani barrage floodplain of Sahibi river, annually leased to the farmers since 1979, so that the land can be returned to the forest department. During 3 months monsoon season surplus water is available from Yamuna which is brought here to create a reservoir of 15 to 20 feet high water, during dry reason the treated sewage water from Rewari and Dharuhera will be brought from this barrage. Upstream large patches of isolated forests and dried lake beds are adjacent to the course of seasonal Sahibi near the villages of Bolni, Bidawas, Jhabuwa, Jat Bhagola, Ajarka, Manethi, Karni Kot and Neemrana, which could be made perennial with excess water thus creating an interconnected-wetlands based eco-corridor in the Delhi Supergroup of Aravalli range from Sariska Tiger Reserve to various nature and national parks of Delhi Ridge up to the national capital of New Delhi.

See also 
 Delhi Ridge
 Leopards of Haryana
 Gurugram leopard and deer safari
 History of Haryana
 List of dams and reservoirs in Haryana
 List of National Parks & Wildlife Sanctuaries of Haryana, India
 Kotla and Nuh System of Lakes
 Dhosi Hill
 Sariska Tiger Reserve
 Masani Amman, a form of Shakti Devi
 List of dams and reservoirs in Haryana

References

External links
 Haryana rivers profile by WWF

Dams on the Yamuna River
Lakes of Haryana
Barrages in India
Bridges in Haryana
Tourist attractions in Haryana
Wetlands of India
Dams in Haryana
Irrigation in Haryana
Dams completed in 1989
1989 establishments in Haryana
20th-century architecture in India